John Service Strong (18 April 1884 – 15 March 1971) was an Australian rules footballer who played with Melbourne in the Victorian Football League (VFL).

Born in Scotland, Strong commenced his football career while captain of Melbourne Grammar School. He later had a prominent business career, holding positions including Chief Assistant in the Trade Commissioner Service and Australian representative of the Society of Motor Manufacturers and Traders.

Notes

External links 

Jack Strong's profile at Demonwiki

1884 births
1971 deaths
VFL/AFL players born outside Australia
Australian rules footballers from Victoria (Australia)
Australian Rules footballers: place kick exponents
Melbourne Football Club players
Brunswick Football Club players
Scottish players of Australian rules football
Scottish emigrants to colonial Australia
People from Helensburgh
People educated at Melbourne Grammar School
20th-century Australian businesspeople